The 1987 British Formula Three season was the 37th season of the British Formula Three Championship. Johnny Herbert took the BARC/BRDC Lucas British Formula 3 Championship.

BARC/BRDC Lucas British F3 Championship 
Champion:  Johnny Herbert

Runner Up:  Bertrand Gachot

National Champion:  Gary Dunn

Results

Lucas British Formula 3 Championship

Non-Championship Race

Championship Tables

Class A

National Class

References

Formula Three
British Formula Three Championship seasons